Algebra Universalis is an international scientific journal focused on universal algebra and lattice theory. The journal, founded in 1971 by George Grätzer, is currently published by Springer-Verlag.   Honorary editors in chief of the journal included Alfred Tarski and Bjarni Jónsson.

External links 
 Algebra Universalis on Springer.com
 Algebra Universalis homepage, including instructions to authors
 

Universal algebra
Mathematics journals
Publications established in 1971
Springer Science+Business Media academic journals